Schizophonic (stylised as Schizö-phonic) is the debut studio album by British pop singer Geri Halliwell. The album was released after her split from popular girl group the Spice Girls. The term schizophonic is a portmanteau of the Greek words schizo ("split", "divide") and phonic ("sound"), and also seemingly a play on the word "schizophrenic" and the musical term "schizophonia". This was the first solo album released by a Spice Girl.

It produced four singles, all of which saw commercial success in the UK—"Mi Chico Latino", "Lift Me Up" and "Bag It Up" reached number one, while the first single "Look at Me" peaked at number two. The album sold over two million copies worldwide.

Background

On 31 May 1998, it was announced that Halliwell had left girl group Spice Girls, with the singer claiming that she was suffering from exhaustion and wanted to take a break. However, rumours of a feud with fellow member Melanie Brown as the reason for her departure were circulated by the press. Halliwell's departure from the group became one of the biggest entertainment news stories of the year, making news headlines the world over. The four remaining members were adamant that the group would carry on, and continued their Spiceworld Tour without her in the summer of 1998. In 2007, she stated on BBC One documentary Giving You Everything that she had "given all I could" and felt like she "didn't belong anymore. They didn't need me anymore, really, and I definitely felt very redundant."

As a solo artist, Halliwell signed a three-album deal with EMI worth US$3 million, influenced by Robbie Williams' solo success after leaving Take That. She then started developing her debut album, asking the Absolute production team—Paul Watson and Andy Watkins—who had already produced songs for the Spice Girls, for help. Allegedly, the four remaining girls from the Spice Girls said that if they worked with Halliwell, they could not work with them again. Eventually, the duo decided to work with the singer. The next year, she launched her solo career and released her debut album titled Schizophonic, which she described as "a cross between Julie Andrews and Johnny Rotten".

Promotion
The album's release was promoted with a documentary, Geri, which was directed by Molly Dineen and screened by Channel 4 on 5 May 1999, following Halliwell's life after her departure from the Spice Girls. Later Halliwell admitted that "With hindsight, it was a mistake, but I was very out of sorts, I was lonely and I felt starved of friendship and intellectual company, which Molly gave me because she is so totally intellectual." While she does not regret doing the documentary, she found it "far too upsetting a prospect to even consider watching it again".

Critical reception

In his review for The Independent, Nicholas Barber declared Schizophonic "considerably more sophisticated and more obviously packed with hits than either of the Spice Girls' albums." People called the album "flip, fun froth from a former Spice." The magazine wrote that "the self-worth, Girl Power sloganeering of her old group is replaced here by Halliwell's plucky, self-deprecating statement of Geri-empowerment [...] Except for a few oversweetened ballads and two ill-advised forays into foreign (Latin and Indian) genres, Solo Girl comports herself well indeed." Karen Schoemer from Rolling Stone remarked that Schizophonic "is more Girl Chutzpah than Girl Power. Geri seems intent on being all spices: sweet, salty, flirty, bossy [...] Geri's voice is flat and unsyncopated – she puts syllables in the darnedest places between the beat – but it has a surprising, undeniable charm. She's like a really enthusiastic impersonator, so anxious to win you over that you give in. Schizophonic doesn't reveal any hidden talents."

AllMusic editor Stephen Thomas Erlewine felt that "unfortunately, Halliwell doesn't have strong collaborators, who know how to exploit her admittedly limited voice, so much of it falls a little flat musically. There are, however, cuts on Schizophonia [that] sparkle with a gleeful, unabashed love of pop and dance. Invariably, the album soars when it's upbeat [...] If Schizophonia doesn't work on some levels, it does succeed as a statement of purpose from the newly independent Halliwell." Chris Charles, writing for BBC News, found that Schizophonic "sees Geri adopt – or attempt to adopt  – so many alter-egos that it is difficult to pin-point which is the real her [...] This mixing and matching is Geri all over. One minute she's popping out of a skimpy Union jack number, the next she's the prissie librarian figure clutching her pampered pooch." NME wrote that "Schizo-phonic, breaking every seduction rule of women's magazines, is an act of pure desperation. Count the signs: the 60-piece orchestra; the Latino number; the plucky showstopper, the maudlin ballad. It's clichid like a river of tears running past, yes, a mountain so high, yet when you're trying to be all things to all people, that's inevitable."

Commercial performance
In the United Kingdom, Schizophonic debuted at number four on the UK Albums Chart, with sales of 35,000 copies. It sold 483,853 in total, being certified two-times Platinum by the British Phonographic Industry (BPI) for shipments of 600,000 copies. In Canada, the album debuted and peaked at number 15. With strong long-term sales the album was certified Platinum with just over 100,000 copies shipped. In the United States, the album faced moderate success, selling 40,000 copies in its first week debuting and peaking at number 42 on the Billboard 200, the strongest Spice Girls solo showing on the chart. It shipped 500,000 copies and received a Gold certification in the country by the Recording Industry Association of America (RIAA). According to Nielsen SoundScan, Schizophonic has sold 181,000 copies there as of July 2007. The album was also certified Gold in Australia and Spain with shipments of over 35,000 and 50,000 copies, respectively. However, the album only reached number 85 in Japan, selling 3,190 copies. By August of the same year of release, more than 1.3 million copies had been distributed through stores, by 2001, more than two million copies had been sold worldwide.

Singles
Three of the four singles from the album went to number one in the United Kingdom, while the debut single made number two. The lead single was "Look at Me", produced by Absolute and Phil Bucknall. It was released in the United Kingdom on 10 May 1999 and it was released the same week as Boyzone's "You Needed Me." In early 1999, Boyzone was at the height of its own success with five UK number-ones, however, Halliwell was confident that "Look at Me" would reach number-one. Though more transactions were made of the "Look at Me" single, two CD singles of "You Needed Me" were released in order for fans to purchase both and ensure that Boyzone made it to the number-one position. "Look at Me" entered the UK Singles Chart at number two, selling 140,000 copies in its first week; it was only 700 copies behind Boyzone's "You Needed Me." Halliwell was disappointed with the outcome of the chart performance for "Look at Me," since she had believed that it would reach number one. She had also feared that her career would be ruined six months after the release of the single. However, Halliwell would earn her first UK number-one single with "Mi Chico Latino." "Look at Me" went on to sell 330,812 copies in the United Kingdom alone, being certified Gold by the BPI, and over 1,5 million copies worldwide.

"Mi Chico Latino" debuted at number one on the UK Singles Chart on 22 August 1999, selling 132,000 copies in its first week, becoming Halliwell's first number-one solo single in the country. It also was the beginning of a sequence of four consecutive Halliwell singles reaching number one in the United Kingdom. It spent fifteen weeks in the charts, and went on to sell almost 383,000 copies in the UK and was certified Silver by the British Phonographic Industry (BPI). "Mi Chico Latino" experienced moderate success in other European markets. In Austria, it entered the singles chart at number 34, eventually peaking at number 27 and spending a total of eight weeks on the chart. In France, the song peaked at number 40, remaining on the chart for ten weeks in total. On the Swiss Singles Chart dated 19 September 1999, it peaked at number 26. In Australia, "Mi Chico Latino" debuted at its peak of number 43 on the issue dated 5 September 1999. The song also experienced success in the United States, peaking at number 19 on Billboard'''s Hot Dance Club Songs chart.

"Lift Me Up" was the third single from the album and the second single which ultimately reached number one in the UK Singles Chart on 13 November 1999, selling 140,000 copies in its first week, 30,000 more copies than "What I Am". Its total sales are 346,000 copies in the United Kingdom, and the single enjoyed a fifteen-week run in the UK chart. The music video for "Lift Me Up" was directed by Howard Greenhalgh and filmed in October 1999 in Málaga, Spain.

"Bag It Up" was the final single from the album and was sold 106,000 copies in its first week, becoming Halliwell's third consecutive solo number one on the UK Singles Chart. It has sold over 260,000 copies and been certified Silver by the British Phonographic Industry. The music video to "Bag It Up" was filmed in January 2000 and was directed by Dawn Shadforth.

Album coversSchizophonic was released with two different covers, representing an angel (white), and a devil (red); both covers are the same edition of the album. On the first "O" on Schizophonic, there is an angel halo on the white cover and horns on the red cover. On the back cover, the song titles are written in both red and white, relating the theme of the song to one of the personalities. The booklet of the album features both covers on all editions, and the lyrics of the songs are included on the side that they are marked on the back cover.

Track listing
Credits adapted from the liner notes of Schizophonic''.

B-sides

Personnel
Geri Halliwell – vocals
Absolute – all instruments
Milton McDonald – guitar
Phil Hudson – guitar (track 2)
Paul 'P-Dub' Walton – engineer

Charts

Weekly charts

Year-end charts

Certifications

References

1999 debut albums
Geri Halliwell albums
Capitol Records albums
EMI Records albums
Albums recorded at Olympic Sound Studios